Yalga may refer to:
Yalga, Burkina Faso, a town in Bam Province of Burkina Faso
Yalga, Russia, name of several inhabited localities in Russia